Ponte Alta do Tocantins is a municipality in the state of Tocantins in the Northern region of Brazil.

The municipality is in the microregion of Jalapão.
The municipality contains part of the  Serra Geral do Tocantins Ecological Station, a strictly protected conservation unit created in 2001 to preserve an area of cerrado.

See also
List of municipalities in Tocantins

References

Municipalities in Tocantins